A cannabis shop, cannabis dispensary, or cannabis cooperative, is a location at which cannabis is sold for recreational or medical use. In the Netherlands these are called coffeeshops. In the United States they exist as an outlet for both recreational and medical use. These shops differ from head shops in that the latter sells only drug paraphernalia. In 2015, the City of San Diego made A Green Alternative the first licensed medical cannabis dispensary and delivery service in the city. The world's largest cannabis dispensary is in Las Vegas, Nevada at 112,000 square feet opened by Planet 13 Holdings.

Coffeeshop

Cannabis selling coffeeshops began in the 1970s. Establishments like Mellow Yellow coffeeshop were known for open cannabis smoking and dealing. After an explosion of hard drugs authorities began to tolerate soft drugs and legalized cannabis selling in registered coffeeshops.

Dispensary

In Canada and certain territories of the United States, dispensaries distribute cannabis to the general public or in some cases only to approved patients. In Uruguay cannabis dispensaries are built by the government and can sell to the public.

Cannabis social club

A Cannabis social club (CSC) is a non-profit members-only industry model for non-medical cannabis. CSCs do not "sell" cannabis but grow the amount needed for their members in exchange for the costs of production, a form of delegation of homecultivationto the club. CSCs exist in New Zealand, Spain Belgium, France, the Netherlands, Slovenia, Austria. and Germany. They are regulated by law in Uruguay (since 2014) and Malta (since 2021).

Bhang shop

In India, several Indian states allow licensed bhang shops to sell bhang, a decoction of cannabis. They mainly sell, traditional cannabis-infused Indian bhang drinks Bhang lassi and Bhang thandai.

References

Cannabis culture
Drug culture
Cannabis shops